Carl Cohn Haste (7 December 1874 – 4 June 1939) was a Danish pianist, organist and composer. 
Blind from the age of 5 after an eye inflammation, he became a music teacher at the Royal Blind Institute, composer and the first president of the Danish Association of the Blind.

From 1883 to 1892 he was a pupil at the Blind Institute. Then he studied at the Royal Danish Academy of Music from 1893 to 1895 under Victor Bendix and Orla Rosenhof. In 1896 he made his debut as a concert pianist and from 1898 he was employed as the Blind Institute as a music teacher. Most of the blind organists who were employed in the early 20th century were trained by him. Alongside his teaching work and organization work, he was in his younger years regularly away on concert tours across Denmark, Sweden and Germany.

In 1928 Carl Cohn was awarded the Knight of the Dannebrog.

Notable works 
Prelude and fugue in e minor (piano 1894)
Prelude and fugue in g minor (piano 1894)
Paroa symphony (1902)
Prelude and intermezzo (piano 1919)
Cantata for the Royal Blind Institute (1920)
Holiday Scenes (piano 1920)
Prelude and fugue in f minor (piano 1926)
some songs

References
This article was initially translated from Danish Wikipedia

1874 births
1939 deaths
Blind classical musicians
Composers awarded knighthoods
Danish classical organists
Male classical organists
Danish classical pianists
Danish composers
Male composers
Musicians awarded knighthoods
Royal Danish Academy of Music alumni
Male classical pianists